Alina Ramona Vătu (née Czeczi; born 15 October 1989) is a Romanian female handball player who plays for Dunărea Brăila.

Achievements  
Liga Națională: 
Bronze Medalist: 2012, 2014, 2017
EHF Cup:
Finalist: 2012

Individual awards 
 Liga Națională Top Scorer: 2019

References

External links 
Alina Vatu Profile at Eurohaball

1989 births
Living people
People from Zalău
Romanian female handball players